Damjan Ošlaj (born 25 August 1976) is a retired Slovenian football defender and manager.

In 2003, Ošlaj made his only appearance for the Slovenia national team.

References

External links
NZS profile 

1976 births
Living people
Prekmurje Slovenes
Slovenian footballers
Association football defenders
Slovenian PrvaLiga players
Slovenian Second League players
NK Mura players
NK Olimpija Ljubljana (1945–2005) players
NK Ljubljana players
NK Maribor players
NK Nafta Lendava players
NK Olimpija Ljubljana (2005) players
ND Mura 05 players
Slovenia youth international footballers
Slovenia international footballers
Slovenian football managers
Slovenian expatriate sportspeople in Bulgaria